One Fair Wage is a nonprofit non-governmental organization in the United States that is led by Saru Jayaraman for restaurant workers to end the sub-minimum wage for tip workers who make less than the minimum wage.However no tipped full service restaurant worker makes less than the federal minimum wage. A tip credit refers to the percentage of the wage made up by the employer paired with tipped income. The Federal Labor Standards Act states that all workers must be paid the federal minimum wage.

History 

Wages in every country is different, so wages given in one country might not be acceptable in other countries. Similarly, wages in different organizations are given according to the set rules of the organizations with the alignment of minimum government rules and regulations. The government in the constitutions set a minimum level of wages which every organization has to follow and can't give less than particular limits but allowed to give higher wages to their workers.  Fair wages are the minimum amount offered to workers who can full fill the family requirements especially to get the food, shelter, and clothing quite easily.  Every organization is free to offer wages according to its own set standards. Fair wages are determined according to circumstances and the nature of the industry. Fair wages or remuneration are paid to workers according to their efficiency for completing objectives. Fair wages are typically more than the minimum wages. Different factors are considered before fixing fair wages, these factors could be, wages paid in the industry, productivity or capacity of the labor efficiency, or ability to complete the task. So these are factors that are helpful for management to fix the fair wages offer to their workers.       The One Fair Wage campaign tipped wage laws in a number of states including Washington D.C. California and six other states already have One Fair Wage. One Fair Wage, chaired by Alicia Renee Farris, is trying to raise the minimum wage in Michigan to $12 an hour by 2022, and to $12 an hour by 2024 for tipped workers. The issue was brought to the General Election ballot on the November 2018. The Michigan Chamber of Commerce opposed the plan. In 2020, following the COVID-19 crisis, One Fair Wage began campaigning to raise money for restaurant wage workers who lost their jobs due to restaurant closures.

References 

Political advocacy groups in the United States